Qargha is a dam and reservoir at Qargha  near Kabul, in Afghanistan. The reservoir and its peripheral areas provide for recreation facilities such as boating, surfing, golfing, etc. and has a hotel on its bank. There is a fishery development in the reservoir supported by a hatchery on its banks. Irrigation and hydropower developments have also been planned from the stored waters of the reservoir.

Location

Features

The dam was built in 1933. A sluice gate of the dam which was damaged has since been restored. The reservoir volume is 32.8 million m3, and was developed for the purpose of recreation in the 1950s when Mohammed Daoud Khan was the Prime Minister of the country. It is now a popular picnic location, particularly on Friday's when it is visited by a large number of picnickers. During the Seventh Fiver Plan of the country, the stored water from the dam was planned for supplementing drinking water to Kabul city.

An irrigation canal is proposed to be built from the dam, and survey for the same has been completed from the dam up to Badambagh. This canal is proposed for providing irrigation and expand horticulture.
 
The reservoir has been developed for trout fishing with a hatchery set up close to the reservoir. As part of recreation, apart from the lake side upscale Spojhmai hotel, there is a nine-hole golf course at the extreme periphery of the reservoir.
A new hydrological station has been set up since 2008 at the location of the reservoir for planning of water resources development as part of the network of 174 hydrological stations and 60 snow gauges and meteorological stations proposed in the country. This project is funded by the United Nations Food and Agriculture Organization (FAO).

As part of future planning for alternate sources of energy, utilization of the stored waters of the reservoir and the drop available in the dam has been studied.

During Soviet–Afghan War, on 26/27 August 1986 there were massive explosions in an army ammunition depot in the lake area.

There was a terrorist attack by the Taliban at the hotel on the edge of the reservoir on 22 June 2012, as it was suspected that it was one of the main centres of prostitution and partying in Kabul. Twenty people including security personnel and the terrorists were killed in the encounter.

Fish hatchery
The reservoir feeds a fish hatchery and stocks the rainbow trout fingerlings. The hatchery was set up in 1967 close to the dam and draws water from this reservoir. The hatchery was established in the 1970s when 30,000 trout fingerlings were produced and then stocked in the Qargha Reservoir and in many other rivers such as Panjsher, Bamian, Salang and Sarde. The objective of stocking in the reservoir was meant as a recreational fishing activity under licensed sport fishing. Under UNDP/FAO assistance the hatchery was rehabilitated in 1987, and during 1988-89 egg incubators were repaired and set up with new egg trays to restart production. Eggs were imported from Denmark in 1988. These were stocked in the floating cages moored in the reservoir so that fishes grew into marketable size. Concrete raceways adjoining the farm were also repaired and put to use. In 1989, the fish farm was capable of producing 10 tons of rainbow trout. However, subsequently production was affected due to terrorist activity.

In 2013, USAID suspended the project claiming that the local governor failed to pay 1.1 million dollars for the 10% of the costs agreed.

Planning for hydropower development
US Army Corps of Engineers in their studies for "Potential Renewable Energy
Technologies in Northwest Kabul", have examined utilization of the storage of Quarga reservoir and the head created by the dam. Two alternatives have been studied.

Gallery

See also
List of dams and reservoirs in Afghanistan

References

Bibliography

External links

 Kabul band qargha (video May 23, 2017)

Dams in Afghanistan
Reservoirs in Afghanistan
Buildings and structures in Kabul Province
Landforms of Kabul Province
Dams completed in 1933
1933 establishments in Afghanistan